Paul Couture may refer to:

 Paul Couture (Canadian politician) (1833–1913), dairy farmer and political figure in Quebec
 Paul A. Couture (1913–1992), American politician
 Paul Couture (sailor), French sailor